This is a list of the England national football team's results from 1870 to the present day that, for various reasons, are not accorded the status of official International A Matches.

1870s

1890s

The Football Association (FA) instigated a four-game tour of Germany and Austria by a representative England team in November 1899. The England team played a representative German team in Berlin on 23 November 1899, with the German side losing 1-0. Two days later a slightly altered German side lost 10–2. The third and fourth matches were played in Prague and Karlsruhe against a combined Austrian and German side, and England won 6–0 and 7–0. Those games cannot be considered as "official" and are known as "proto-international matches" (Ur-Länderspiele) in Germany because they were organised by a regional federation from Berlin and the German Football Association (DFB) was not founded until 28 January 1900.

1900s

1910s

World War I

1920s

1930s

World War II

1940s

1950s

1960s

1970s

1980s

1990s
1995
The friendly match between England and the Republic of Ireland on 15 February 1995 in Dublin had to be abandoned after 27 minutes due to missile throwing and riotous disorder among extremist elements in the England support; caps were still awarded to the players and the match (along with David Kelly's goal for Ireland) is counted as a full international; it was never replayed.

1996 

1998

2010s

See also
:Category:England v Scotland representative footballers (1870–1872)
:Category:England wartime international footballers

References

 
Unofficial
Wartime association football
Lists of national association football team unofficial results